The Cathedral of St. Vincent de Paul is a Roman Catholic church located in Tunis, Tunisia. The cathedral is dedicated to Saint Vincent de Paul, patron saint of charity. It is the episcopal see of the Archdiocese of Tunis and is situated at Place de l'Indépendence in Ville Nouvelle, a crossroads between Avenue Habib Bourguiba and Avenue de France, opposite the French embassy.

The church, designed by L. Bonnet-Labranche, was built in a mixture of styles, including Moorish revival, Gothic revival, and Neo-Byzantine architectural traditions. The cornerstone was laid in 1890, and construction began in 1893. The church was opened on Christmas in 1897, albeit without its belltowers owing to a shortage of funds. The reinforced concrete towers were completed in 1910 using the Hennebique technique.

Cardinal Charles Lavigerie laid the first stone for a church on 7 November 1881, a little further down Avenue de la Marine (now Avenue Habib Bourguiba). This was a pro-cathedral; the cathedral of the archdiocese (then called Carthage) being the Saint Louis Cathedral. The pro-cathedral was built quickly, but its condition soon deteriorated due to the adverse ground conditions, necessitating the construction of the current cathedral.

The number of Roman Catholics in Tunisia fell rapidly following Tunisian independence from France. A modus vivendi reached between the Republic of Tunisia and the Vatican in 1964 resulted in the transfer of selected buildings to the Tunisian state for public use, including the Acropolium of Carthage in Carthage. However, the Cathedral of St. Vincent de Paul remains under the ownership and operation of the Roman Catholic Church in Tunisia.

See also
Chapelle Saint-Louis de Carthage

Notes

External links

 Archdiocese of Tunis page 
 Cathedral of St. Vincent de Paul on structurae

Churches completed in 1897
19th-century Roman Catholic church buildings
Vincent de Paul
Religious buildings and structures in Tunis
Byzantine Revival architecture in Tunisia
Gothic Revival church buildings in Tunisia
Moorish Revival architecture